Kasula Purushottama Kavi was a Telugu poet who lived during the late 18th century. His parents were Kasula Appalaraju and Ramanamma. He hailed from the Diviseema area of Krishna District, Andhra Pradesh. He was a court poet of the then-Raja of Challapalli, Yarlagadda Ankineedu Prasad I (r. 1792–1819) of the Challapalli Samasthanam and possibly of his father as well. Purushottama Kavi is recognized for composing literary works in Telugu consisting of one hundred poetic stanzas, known as satakams.

Works 
Kasula Purushottama Kavi is known for composing the Andhra Nayaka Satakam on Srikakula Andhra Mahavishnu, apparently when the temple was occupied by raiding Muslim soldiers. The prominent Andhra Maha Vishnu Temple, to whose presiding deity Purushottama Kavi dedicated his satakam to, is where Vijayanagara Emperor Krishnadevaraya had a dream compelling him to write the Telugu text Amuktamalyada. From this satakam's refrain ('killer of false believers'), there is an indication that there was religious conflict in this period. The taunting tone and upbraiding of the deity is a consistent theme of this satakam. Purushottama Kavi uses three epithets to describe Andhra Mahavishnu in this satakam: 'God of many miracles,' 'darling of women,' and 'Lord of Andhra in Srikakulam.' The twelfth poetic stanza (translated) of this satakam reads as follows:

After hearing a recital of Purushottama Kavi's satakam, the Challapalli zamindar, his patron, is said to have been moved by it and renovated the Srikakulam Andhra Vishnu Temple and restored worship there. Kasula Purushottama Kavi also composed Hamsaladeevi Gopala Satakam, Manasa Bodha Satakam, Bhakta Kalpadruma Satakam, and Venugopala Satakam. Around the central Circar Districts, his Manasa Bodha has also been quite popular.

References

Telugu poets
18th-century poets
18th-century Indian people